Nick Zimmerman (born May 3, 1987 in Tampa, Florida) is an American soccer player.

Career

Coaching
Zimmerman began coaching in 2015 for Columbus State University's women's soccer program, a Division II school in Columbus, GA, as the assistant coach under Jay Entlich.

College and amateur
Zimmerman played college soccer for James Madison University from 2005 to 2008. In his four years with James Madison, he appeared in 75 matches scoring 13 goals. He was primarily used as a central midfielder. In 2007, he also played club soccer for a top Florida youth club, HC United. He also played for Brandon Flames and Temple Terrace Spirit.

Professional
Zimmerman was drafted in the third round (44th overall) of the 2009 MLS SuperDraft by New York Red Bulls. His play in pre-season earned him a contract with the Major League Soccer club. He made his debut for the team on 20 March 2009 in a friendly against Portland Timbers which ended in a scoreless draw.

Zimmerman was briefly sent on loan to Crystal Palace Baltimore in the USL Second Division in May 2009. He made his professional debut for Palace on May 15, 2009, in a 1–0 win against Western Mass Pioneers, and made his MLS debut for New York on June 4, 2009, as a second-half substitute in a 2–0 defeat to D.C. United.

Zimmerman was selected by Philadelphia Union in the 2009 MLS Expansion Draft on November 25, 2009. He also spent time on loan with Harrisburg City Islanders in the USL Second Division. He was waived by Philadelphia on March 1, 2011.

He signed with Carolina RailHawks FC of the North American Soccer League in April 2011. In December 2011, Carolina re-signed Zimmerman for the 2012 season. Zimmerman scored 15 goals for the Railhawks in 2012 and was named to the 2012 NASL Best XI.

After an injury-ravaged 2014, Zimmerman left Carolina and signed with United Soccer League club Wilmington Hammerheads on March 12, 2015.

International
In 2001 Zimmerman played for the United States Under-15 national team.

Career statistics
Updated 17 August 2011

References

External links

James Madison profile

1987 births
Living people
American soccer players
Association football midfielders
Association football forwards
Crystal Palace Baltimore players
James Madison Dukes men's soccer players
Major League Soccer players
New York Red Bulls draft picks
New York Red Bulls players
North American Soccer League players
North Carolina FC players
Penn FC players
Philadelphia Union players
Soccer players from Tampa, Florida
USL Championship players
USL Second Division players
Wilmington Hammerheads FC players